Raut (also spelled as Rawat) is an Indian caste, whose traditional occupation is herding.

The  Rauts are mainly found in the Chhattisgarh state, and the neighbouring states of Madhya Pradesh and Maharashtra.  Traditionally, they were predominantly distributed in the districts of Durg, Raipur, Bastar, Nagpur and Bhandara.

History 
Raut may have been a tribal militia in Chhota Nagpur, originating from the Kawar and Kol tribes, and probably a small number of local Rajputs.

Culture 
Traditionally, the Rauts were involved in herding and milking cattle. Traditionlly, their main business was sale of milk and milk products.

Raut Nacha is a traditional dance of the Raut community which is performed on Diwali. In this dance, the Rauts wear a special costume, sing and dance in a group with sticks in their hands in the village pathways.

The Raut men traditionally performed the local folk epic Candaini (or Chandaini) in a combination of dance and song. The epic tells the story of princess Chanda, who leaves her impotent husband and falls in love with a common man Veer Lorik. Both the characters are from the Raut caste, and the epic seems to have originated in this caste. As late as 1980, the Candaini performers used to be primarily from the Raut caste, but now people from other communities also take part in the performances.

In the 20th century, they underwent Sanskritisation, and adopted customs and values of the high-caste Hindus.

Sub-castes and related groups 

The main Raut sub-castes include Gawala, Thetwar, Jheriya, and Kosariya.

The Rauts are included in the central list of Other Backward Classes for Chhattisgarh, along with other herding castes and sub-castes including Ahir, Brajwasi, Gawli, Gawali, Goli, Lingayat-Gaoli, Gowari (Gwari), Gowra, Gawari, Gwara, Jadav, Yadav, Thethwar, and Gop/Gopal.

References

Bibliography 

 

Herding castes
Indian castes
Social groups of Chhattisgarh